Toa Halafihi (born 27 November 1993) is a New Zealand-born Italian professional rugby union player who primarily plays number eight for Benetton of the United Rugby Championship. He has also represented Italy at international level, having made his test debut against France during the 2022 Six Nations Championship. Halafihi has previously played for clubs such as Poverty Bay, Taranaki, Hurricanes, and Lyon in the past.

Early life 
Born and raised in the city of Gisborne in the northeastern part of New Zealand, Halafihi was schooled at Gisborne Boys' High School in his hometown and played first XV rugby for them. After graduating high school, he played a season of Heartland Championship rugby with Poverty Bay in 2012 before later moving to Taranaki to play club rugby with Spotswood United.

Club career 
Halafihi first played provincial rugby for Taranaki during their ITM Cup Premiership title winning season of 2014, starting once and coming on as a replacement twice.   He was much more of a regular in 2015, scoring 3 times in 9 outings to help the Bulls reach the Premiership semi-finals where they surrendered their crown to eventual winners, going down 46-20.

2016 saw him play in all 11 of Taranki's games and score 5 tries, although owing to stiff competition from the likes of Lachlan Boshier, Mitchell Brown, Mitchell Crosswell and Iopu Iopu-Aso, he was restricted to just 6 starts.

Good performances at domestic level for Taranaki over the course of the preceding 2 seasons brought him to the attention of Wellington-based Super Rugby franchise, the  who named him in their squad ahead of their title defense in 2017.

International career 
On the 8 December 2021, he was selected by Alessandro Troncon to be part of an Emerging Italy 27-man squad for the 2021 end-of-year rugby union internationals.

In February 2022, he was selected for Italy for the first time by coach Kieran Crowley for the 2022 Six Nations Championship, despite never having been capped for the senior squad. He made his debut against France.

Honours 

Taranaki

ITM Cup - 2014

References

External links 

1993 births
Living people
New Zealand rugby union players
Rugby union flankers
Rugby union number eights
Poverty Bay rugby union players
Taranaki rugby union players
People educated at Gisborne Boys' High School
Rugby union players from Gisborne, New Zealand
New Zealand people of Fijian descent
New Zealand expatriate sportspeople in Italy
New Zealand expatriate rugby union players
Expatriate rugby union players in Italy
Hurricanes (rugby union) players
Lyon OU players
Benetton Rugby players
Italian rugby union players
Italy international rugby union players